Arash Parsania (born 4 April 1972), since 1991 known as ARASH, is an Iranian-German composer of electronic, dance and orchestral music.

Biography

Early life
ARASH was born on April 4, 1972, in Tehran, Iran. After spending a couple of years with his family in Paris, France, he returned to Iran when he was 7 years old, just a few months before the start of the Iranian revolution. ARASH went to the elementary and middle school in Iran before relocating to Germany at the age of 14. Despite his very strong interest in music, playing and listening to music was not allowed in the Islamic Republic, so ARASH only began playing music for the first time in Germany at the age of 16.

Professional musical career
Since 1988 electronic musical instruments play the most important role in ARASH’s music. Three years later, in 1991, after having started gaining experience with electronic musical instruments, ARASH released his first studio album Corpus Pineale.

ARASH is one of the first Iranian composers of pure electronic music (maybe he is the very first, but there is no concrete information available yet).

1994 ARASH released a CD ARASH - The Compilation.

1998 ARASH released a single "Freeze" and published the next compilation album of his previously unreleased music Dance Traxx 1992-1998 containing electronic instrumental and vocal based dance music. One year after releasing other Dance titles "!s Back" and "Control Me", in the year 2000 ARASH got back to his roots and released another single track "Synphonic", which was a mixture of Orchestral, Electronic, and modern Techno Music.

2010, after a longer break, ARASH released a new studio album Yearning, the first album after Corpus Pineale.

2015, five years later, ARASH has released a new studio album Creation. The album consists of seven parts, from "The First Tablet" through "The Seventh Tablet", which brings the worlds of Orchestral and Electronic Music together.

Discography

Albums
1991: Corpus Pineale (Studio Album)
1994: ARASH - The Compilation (Compilation)
1998: Dance Traxx 1992-1998 (Compilation)
2010: Yearning (Studio Album)
2015: Creation (Studio Album)

Singles
1998: freeze (Single)
1999: !s Back (Single)
1999: control me (Single)
2000: Synphonic (Single)

References

External links 
 Official Website: www.ARASHworld.net

1972 births
20th-century classical composers
21st-century classical composers
Iranian emigrants to Germany
German classical musicians
German classical composers
German electronic musicians
German techno musicians
Living people
German male classical composers
New-age composers
New-age synthesizer players
German trance music groups
People from Tehran
Musicians from Munich
20th-century German composers
21st-century German composers
20th-century German male musicians
21st-century German male musicians